A camarilla is a group of courtiers or favourites who surround a king or ruler. Usually, they do not hold any office or have any official authority at the royal court but influence their ruler behind the scenes. Consequently, they also escape having to bear responsibility for the effects of their advice. The term derives from the Spanish word camarilla (diminutive of cámara), meaning "little chamber" or private cabinet of the king. It was first used of the circle of cronies around Spanish King Ferdinand VII (reigned 1814-1833). The term involves what is known as cronyism. The term also entered other languages like the German and Greek, and is used in the sense given above.

A similar concept in modern politics is that of a Kitchen Cabinet, which is often composed of unelected advisers bypassing traditional governance practices.

Examples

Germany
In particular, two groups are called camarillas: those who surrounded the Emperor Wilhelm II and the President Paul von Hindenburg.

The camarilla of President Paul von Hindenburg
Oskar von Hindenburg, the son of the President
Otto Meissner, secretary of state, chief of the presidential office
General Kurt von Schleicher, head of the military office in the Defence Ministry, later Chancellor
Franz von Papen, Chancellor

Romania

The camarilla of Queen Marie
Barbu Ştirbey, prince and lover of the queen

The camarilla of King Carol II
Elena Lupescu, mistress and later wife of King Carol II 
Puiu Dumitrescu, private secretary of King Carol II (earlier period) 
Barbu Ionescu, businessman 
Hugo Bacher 
Nae Ionescu, philosopher and journalist (1930-1933)
Gavrilă Marinescu, Bucharest police prefect
Ernest Urdăreanu, secretary of King Carol II (later period)
Max Auschnitt, industrialist 
Nicolae Malaxa, industrialist 
Aristide Blank, industrialist
Mihai Moruzov, head of the Romanian Secret Intelligence Service

Russia
In the 19th century, Russia's government was frequently described as a "camarilla", starting as early as 1860. This usage remained common into the 20th century; for instance, in 1917, commentator Robert Machray wrote of "certain forces in the background of the political life of Russia known as the 'Camarilla', which exercised and still exercise an extraordinary influence".

Spain

The right-wing domestic circle with which Francisco Franco surrounded himself with in his final years at the Royal Palace of El Pardo, his official residence, has been referred to as a "camarilla" by multiple authors.

The "El Pardo" camarilla of Francisco Franco
Cristóbal Martínez-Bordiú, son-in-law of Franco
Carmen Polo, wife of Franco
Vicente Gil García, personal physician to Franco 
José Ramón Gavilán, head of Franco's personal military staff
Antonio Urcelay Rodríguez, naval aide to Franco
Felipe Polo Martínez-Valdés, brother-in-law and personal lawyer of Franco

Other 

 "Camarilla" is also the name of a "sect" (faction) in the role-playing game Vampire: The Masquerade.
 The Camarilla is a multi-planetary, multi-species secret organization intent on keeping Earth isolated from the rest of the galaxy in Brian Daley's "Fitzhugh & Floyt" trilogy.
 The Camarilla is a multi-planetary, multi-species secret organization with varied and often obscure motives in Lisanne Norman's Sholan Alliance.
 The Camarilla is an ancient, secret organization of witch hunters in the American TV show Motherland: Fort Salem.

See also
Privy Council
Cabal
Courtier
Royal court
Cabal Ministry
Cliveden set
Éminence grise
Power behind the throne
The School of Night
Makhzen
Imperial Preceptor

References

Deep politics
Political terminology